Bogdan Riznić (born 24 February 1990) is a Serbian professional basketball player for Žitko Basket.

Riznić played in Partizan in 2008–09 season and won Adriatic League, Radivoj Korać Cup and Basketball League of Serbia.

References

External links
 Profile at Euroleague.net

1990 births
Living people
ABA League players
Basketball League of Serbia players
KK Partizan players
KK Vojvodina Srbijagas players
KK Zlatibor players
KK Slodes players
KK Žitko Basket players
BKK Radnički players
KK Radnik Bijeljina players
Serbian men's basketball players
Serbian expatriate basketball people in Bosnia and Herzegovina
Serbian expatriate basketball people in Slovakia
Serbian expatriate basketball people in Portugal
Shooting guards